Bigeldy is a rural locality (a selo) in Novoselsky Selsoviet, Burlinsky District, Altai Krai, Russia. The population was 30 as of 2013. It was founded in 1911. There are 2 streets.

Geography 
Bigeldy is located 25 km northwest of Burla (the district's administrative centre) by road. Novoselskoye is the nearest rural locality.

References 

Rural localities in Burlinsky District